is a Japanese light novel series written by Hitoshi Yoshioka. It was adapted into an original video animation film, Suikoden Demon Century, directed by Hiroshi Negishi and released on September 25, 1993. It was released on VHS & LaserDisc in the United States.

Characters
Takateru
Amamoto
Miyuki

Reception
On Anime News Network, Justin Sevakis said of the anime: "Suikoden is appalling. It is the pinnacle of lazy storytelling; the end result of commercialism without the actual commercial appeal."

References

External links

1993 anime OVAs
Anime films based on light novels
J.C.Staff
Japanese direct-to-video films
Kadokawa Sneaker Bunko
Light novels